Giovanni Achenza (born 1971) is an Italian paratriathlete. He represented Italy at the 2016 Summer Paralympics in the men's PT1 event, as well as at the 2020 Summer Paralympics in the men's PTWC event, winning the bronze medal in both competitions.

References

External links
 

Living people
1971 births
Place of birth missing (living people)
Italian male triathletes
Paratriathletes of Italy
Paratriathletes at the 2016 Summer Paralympics
Paratriathletes at the 2020 Summer Paralympics
Medalists at the 2016 Summer Paralympics
Medalists at the 2020 Summer Paralympics
Paralympic bronze medalists for Italy
Paralympic medalists in paratriathlon
20th-century Italian people
21st-century Italian people